Julianne Lyn McNamara (born October 11, 1965) is an American former artistic gymnast, who was born to Australians Jean and Kevin McNamara. She was the winner of the U.S. women's first individual event gold medal in Olympic history.

Career
McNamara won the 1980 US all-around title and qualified for the 1980 Olympic team but did not compete due to the Olympic Committee's boycott of the 1980 Summer Olympics in Moscow, Russia. As consolation, she was one of 461 athletes to receive a Congressional Gold Medal many years later. A year later, at the World Championships that were coincidentally also held in Moscow, McNamara notched the top U.S. women's world all-around finish (seventh place) at that point in history. She also earned a bronze medal on bars, a seventh on floor and finished fifth on beam. She had entered the beam final in first place but went overtime in the final.

At the 1982 World Cup, McNamara fell off the bars to place eighth all-around. In finals, however, she earned a bronze on vault and a seventh place on beam. At the 1983 world championships, she finished 16th all-around, sixth on vault, and seventh on uneven bars.

In 1982, The Flower Council of Holland, headed by namesake Dutch Queen Juliana, christened the Julianne McNamara rose. At the time, the only other American woman to be so honored was the then U.S. First Lady Nancy Reagan.

The climax of McNamara's athletic career was at the 1984 Olympic Games in Los Angeles. There, she tied Ma Yanhong from China for first on the uneven bars (both gymnasts scored 10.00), won the silver on floor, and placed fourth all-around. As of the 2020 Olympic Games in Tokyo, she is the only American to win gold in the uneven bars event.

Eponymous skill
McNamara has one eponymous skill listed in the Code of Points, an uneven bars mount.

Retirement
Although the 1984 Olympics was her last formal competition, McNamara did not retire officially until 1987. Her international accomplishments are considered to have played a major role in spotlighting the U.S. women's team in the early 1980s. Even though she only had the opportunity to be named the national All-Around champion in 1980, she was internationally recognized as the top American gymnast from 1980 to 1982.

Upon her retirement from gymnastics, McNamara embarked on an acting career, appearing in television shows such as Charles in Charge and Knight Rider. She also did color commentary for some television gymnastics coverage.

In 1989, McNamara married baseball player Todd Zeile, whom she met while attending UCLA. She retired from her acting career, and the couple had four children together. One of her daughters, Hannah Zeile, currently stars as teenage Kate Pearson on This Is Us.  McNamara and Zeile divorced in January 2015.

References

External links

 

1965 births
Living people
American female artistic gymnasts
Olympic gold medalists for the United States in gymnastics
Olympic silver medalists for the United States in gymnastics
Sportspeople from Queens, New York
Gymnasts at the 1984 Summer Olympics
Medalists at the World Artistic Gymnastics Championships
Originators of elements in artistic gymnastics
Medalists at the 1984 Summer Olympics
Congressional Gold Medal recipients
U.S. women's national team gymnasts
American people of Australian descent
21st-century American women